Steve, Steven, or Stephen Knight may refer to:
Steve Knight (musician) (1935–2013), American jazz/rock keyboard
Steve Knight (politician) (born 1966), former U.S. Representative from California
Steve Knight (pool player) (1973–2019), British pool player
Steven Knight (born 1959), British writer and co-creator of Who Wants to Be a Millionaire?
Steven Knight (footballer) (1961–2009), Australian rules footballer
Stephen Knight (author) (1951–1985), British author
Stephen Knight (martyr) (died 1555), English Protestant martyr
Stephen Knight (poet) (born 1960), Welsh writer
Stephen Knight (politician), former Member of the London Assembly (2012-2016)
Stephen Knight (rugby) (born 1948), former representative Australian rugby league and rugby union footballer
Stephen Thomas Knight (born 1940), British academic